"Waking the Demon" is a song by Welsh heavy metal band Bullet for My Valentine. The song is released as the third and final single from their second album Scream Aim Fire. The video for the song was written and directed by Max Nichols (son of Academy Award-winning director Mike Nichols).

Song concept
The meaning of this song is all about revenge. Matt Tuck, the band's lead singer and rhythm guitarist, said:

The video was released on 16 April 2008 as the band's MySpace video.
On 7 April 2009, "Waking the Demon" was released as a downloadable song for Rock Band.

Music video 

The video is about a teenage heavy metal fan (Cohlie Brocato) who is bullied in high school by a jock (Noah Fleiss). The leader of the group is dating a girl who seems sympathetic for the boy, but is not brave enough to stand up for him. There are numerous shots of the band playing in a moonlit forest. Throughout the video, the jock repeatedly attacks the boy, including spraying warm showers on him in the locker room and dumping a Strawberry shake on him in class, tripping him, pushing him into walls, smacking him with a towel, splashing bathroom water on his face, etc.

Meanwhile, as the days pass, the teenager crosses off dates on a calendar in his locker. He circles the last date, the 28th, which is labeled "Full Moon". That night, he watches the jocks' leader waiting in the forest for his girlfriend, who lured him to the forest by asking to meet him there so that the teenage boy could get revenge on him. The teenager throws a balloon filled with cottage cheese at the jock's car to provoke him to chase him deeper into the forest. The song prepares for the solo as the jock chases the boy through the forest.

As the guitar solo starts, the teenager falls down on his knees and the full moon comes out of the clouds, turning him into a werewolf. The bully approaches the now changed boy. Once the jock sees the teenage victim's face, the jock is horrified and tries to run, and is implied to have been slaughtered by the werewolf. Blood drips from the werewolf's mouth and hands. The next day at school, there is a new sign displaying the original bully as missing. Now, another jock tries to show his anger towards the teenager and tries to harass him a little bit.

The girl who dated the old bully runs up and hugs him, hinting that now she's going out with him after news that the leader went missing. As the other jock walks off with the girl, she looks at the teenager, giving him a look of "I'm on your side" and he sees her eyes glow red (revealing that she also is a werewolf like himself). He smiles knowing that her new "boyfriend" will be the next victim, and crosses out the first day of the next month waiting for the full moon to come again, implying that the new jock won't be able to harass him so easily.

As of March 2022, the song has 78 million views on YouTube.

Track listing
iTunes Single
 "Waking the Demon" (Rock Radio Mix) – 4:07
 "Say Goodnight" (acoustic version) – 3:14

Personnel
Bullet for My Valentine
Matthew "Matt" Tuck lead vocals, rhythm guitar
Michael "Padge" Pagetlead guitar
Michael "Moose" Thomasdrums
Jason "Jay" Jamesbass guitar, backing vocals

Production
Produced by Colin Richardson
Music video directed by Max Nicols

Release history

Charts

References

External links
 Official Music Video

2008 singles
Bullet for My Valentine songs
Songs written by Matthew Tuck
2008 songs
Jive Records singles
Songs written by Michael Paget
Songs written by Jason James (musician)
Songs about bullying
Songs about revenge